Alessia Caracciolo (born July 11, 1996), known professionally as Alessia Cara, is a Canadian singer-songwriter. Born in Mississauga, Canada, to Italian parents, she began posting covers of songs on YouTube at age 13. After uploading acoustic covers of songs such as "Love Yourself" and "Sweater Weather" online, she signed with EP Entertainment and Def Jam Recordings in 2014 and released her debut single, "Here", the following year. It peaked at number 19 on the Canadian Hot 100 chart and was a sleeper hit in the US, peaking at number 5 on the Billboard Hot 100 chart.

Cara's debut studio album, Know-It-All (2015), peaked at number 8 on the Canadian Albums Chart and at number 9 on the Billboard 200. The album's third single, "Scars to Your Beautiful", peaked at number 8 on the Billboard Hot 100 in 2016. In 2017, Cara collaborated with DJ and producer Zedd on the single "Stay", which is certified seven-times platinum in Canada, and featured alongside Khalid on rapper Logic's song .

Cara has received nominations for four Grammy Awards, winning the Best New Artist in 2018. She was nominated for Song of the Year and Record of the Year at the 2019 Latin Grammys for her collaboration with Juanes on "Querer Mejor". Her second studio album, The Pains of Growing (2018), saw the moderate commercial success of the singles "Growing Pains" and "Trust My Lonely". The album won Juno Award for Album of the Year and Juno Award for Pop Album of the Year while she went on to win Juno Award for Songwriter of the Year. Her third album, In the Meantime (2021), was met with generally positive reviews from critics.

Early life and education
Alessia Cara was born on July 11, 1996, in Mississauga, Ontario, and grew up in Brampton, where she attended Cardinal Ambrozic Catholic Secondary School. Her family is from Calabria, Italy; her father was born in Canada to Italian parents, and her mother is an Italian immigrant. Cara is the second of four children. She can speak Italian fluently. As a child, she wrote poetry and performed in theatre. She began playing guitar at the age of 10 and taught herself how to play various songs. At the age of 13, she began her own YouTube channel where she posted covers of songs that she performed. She saw Justin Bieber as a career model at the time.

Career

2014–2017: Career beginnings and Know-It-All 

In July 2014, Cara, accompanied by her father, went to New York, where she signed a management deal with EP Entertainment, and began work on her debut studio album later that same year. She briefly took the professional simply of Alessia before adding a clipping of her surname to become known as Alessia Cara. In April 2015, Cara released her official debut single through Def Jam. Titled "Here", it was described by MTV as "a song for everyone who secretly hates parties." Produced by Pop & Oak and Sebastian Kole, the song is about her personal experience with going to a party and being uncomfortable at it. On May 5, 2015, the song was chosen as the "can't-miss" track by Spin, as well as being listed as a "must hear song" by Cosmopolitan. The song was also named one of the best Canadian songs of April by Complex and included on Billboards "20 Pop Songs You Need For Your Summer Playlist" in June 2015. Rolling Stone later ranked "Here" at number 21 on its year-end list of the 50 best songs of 2015. On July 29, 2015, Cara made her television debut on The Tonight Show Starring Jimmy Fallon. "Here" then received a nomination for "Original Song" at the Streamy Awards. She released the EP Four Pink Walls, containing five songs, including her debut single. Her debut album, Know-It-All, was released on November 13, 2015.

From January to April 2016, Cara embarked on her first headlining tour, the "Know-It-All Tour", performing in various US and Canadian cities. She was short-listed for the BBC Music Sound of... award for 2016 and finished as the runner-up. Cara was awarded as Breakthrough Artist of the Year at the 2016 Juno Awards. On March 7, 2016, Cara released a music video for "Wild Things." In April 2016, Cara was announced to be one of the supporting acts of British alternative rock band Coldplay in the European and North American legs of their A Head Full of Dreams Tour, alongside British singer songwriter and Grammy winner Foxes. On June 23, 2016, Cara was featured in a re-released version of the song "Wild" by Troye Sivan. The music video was released on July 22, 2016. She played Glastonbury Festival on June 24, 2016, in the John Peel tent. The music video for Cara's version of the single "How Far I'll Go", from the Disney film Moana, was released on November 3, 2016, and since then has received over 270 million views on YouTube. The song was written by Lin-Manuel Miranda, produced by Oak Felder, and the video was directed by Aya Tanimura. On December 15, 2016, Cara released a music video for "Seventeen".

Cara performed as the musical guest on Saturday Night Live on February 4, 2017. On April 18, 2017, the music video of the song "Stay" by Zedd featuring Cara was released. Cara was also featured on the song "1-800-273-8255" from Logic's Everybody album. The song was released as a single on April 28, 2017, and also features American singer-songwriter Khalid. Cara also made an appearance in the video, which was released on August 17, 2017.

2018–2020: The Pains of Growing and This Summer 

On January 28, 2018, Cara was named the Best New Artist at the 2018 Grammy Awards, making her the first Canadian artist to win this award. On June 1, 2018, Cara released a teaser video following a week of cryptic Twitter posts. On June 9, she posted lyrics to a new song on her social media accounts for fans to piece together. Once completed, she announced the single's cover and name on June 11. The single, entitled "Growing Pains", was released on June 15, 2018. Its music video was released on June 20, 2018, and was nominated for Best Cinematography at the 2018 MTV VMAS.

On July 10, 2018, Cara announced that she would be releasing a song she made in her basement, written and produced by her, the next day, as a small gift for her birthday. The single, titled "A Little More", was released on July 11, 2018, with the music video also released the same day. On September 29, 2018, the Canadian Football League announced that Cara would be the halftime performer at the 106th Grey Cup. In October 2018, she collaborated with Italian singer Eros Ramazzotti for the song "Vale per sempre", from the album Vita ce n'è. On October 5, 2018, Cara released another song, entitled "Trust My Lonely". A music video for the song was released the same day. On November 8, 2018, a music video for the song "Babies" by Kyle featuring Cara was released. On November 13, 2018, Cara released another song, entitled "Not Today". The release date coincides with the three-year anniversary of the release of her debut album. Cara's second studio album, The Pains of Growing, was released on November 30, 2018. It debuted at number 1 on the US iTunes Pop Charts, in less than two hours after its release. Despite the successful position on iTunes, the album debuted at number 71 on the Billboard 200; 62 positions lower than her debut album in 2015. "Out of Love" was eventually serviced to contemporary hit radio as the album's third single in January 2019. Cara also collaborated with Alec Benjamin on "Let Me Down Slowly", which was released on January 7, 2019. On February 21, Cara announced she would join Shawn Mendes as the opening act on his self-titled world tour for the European, United Kingdom, and United States legs. In May, she headlined "The Pains of Growing Tour," visiting Canadian cities in the month of May.

In July 2019, Cara announced the release of an EP, This Summer, with tracks to be issued "every couple of weeks" leading up to its release on September 6, 2019. She also announced that she would be adding a new leg of "The Pains of Growing Tour," visiting various US cities in October and November. The first single of the EP, "Ready", was released on July 22. The second single, "Rooting for You", was released on August 9. The third single, "OKAY OKAY", was released on August 23. The fourth single, "October", was released on September 3. The music video for "October" was released on October 1, 2019.

Cara was featured in Bastille's song "Another Place" with a music video released on November 1. The song peaked the number 18 at Billboard Hot Rock Songs.

On March 6, 2020, Cara collaborated with American singer and songwriter Lauv for the song "Canada" on Lauv's debut album, How I'm Feeling. On April 3, 2020, Cara released "I Choose", for the 2020 Netflix animated movie The Willoughbys, where she made her debut voice-role on a film for the character "Jane Willoughby".

On July 17, 2020, Cara released her first live EP, This Summer: Live Off The Floor, which features live, reimagined performances of the songs off of This Summer, as well as three bonus tracks and an intro that interpolates Summertime by George Gershwin. All of Cara's proceeds from the EP for the next 21 years are going to Save The Children.

2021–present: In the Meantime 
On July 2, 2021, Cara announced that the lead singles "Sweet Dream" and "Shapeshifter" from her third studio album would be released on July 15, 2021. The announcement of this release came after five days of cryptic posts on Instagram and Twitter, each with pictures that would turn out to be related to the music videos for the singles. The music video for "Sweet Dream" was released that same day, while the music video for "Shapeshifter" was released on July 23, 2021. A riddle to help fans decode the title of the album was sent to Cara's emailing list the day before.

On August 2, 2021, it was announced that Cara would be releasing "The Use In Trying", an original song for the 2021 animated movie PAW Patrol: The Movie, on August 10, 2021. On August 5, 2021, it was announced that Cara wrote and sang "Feel You Now", the theme song for Blade Runner: Black Lotus.

On August 31, 2021, another clue about the album was sent to Cara's emailing list, this time an image of five clocks all pointing towards 9:24. On September 2, 2021, Cara revealed the album's cover and announced that it is titled In the Meantime and would be released on September 24, 2021. On September 10, 2021, Cara collaborated with the Mexican rock band The Warning, on a cover of "Enter Sandman", which was released on the charity tribute album The Metallica Blacklist.

On September 24, 2021, Cara's album In the Meantime was released alongside the music video for the song "Best Days". The album was met with critical acclaim from music critics, praising Cara's introspective and vulnerable lyricism.

On December 23, 2021, the 2021 edition of Yearly Departed was released on Amazon Prime Video, featuring Cara performing "My Heart Will Go On" at the end of the production.

In 2023, she participated in an all-star recording of Serena Ryder's single "What I Wouldn't Do", which was released as a charity single to benefit Kids Help Phone's Feel Out Loud campaign for youth mental health.

Personal life
Cara lives in Toronto, and is unmarried. She has revealed on separate occasions that she experiences synesthesia, and also has keratosis pilaris and alopecia areata. She has also been open about her struggles with mental health and insomnia. Cara has dual Canadian and Italian citizenship.

Artistry
Cara is a pop, R&B, alternative R&B, indie pop and soul singer. Her influences include Lauryn Hill, Amy Winehouse, Pink, Fergie, Christina Aguilera, Drake, Ed Sheeran, and Taylor Swift.

Discography

 Know-It-All (2015)
The Pains of Growing (2018)
 In the Meantime (2021)

Filmography

Film

Television

Awards and nominations

In 2018, Cara became the first Canadian artist to ever win the Grammy Award for Best New Artist.
She has also received nominations at the American Music Awards and Billboard Music Awards, and won an iHeartRadio Music Award, five Juno Awards, two MTV Video Music Awards, and an MTV Europe Music Award.

References

External links

 
 Def Jam Recordings profile for Alessia Cara
 Alessia Cara on the Internet Movie Database

21st-century Canadian women singers
21st-century multi-instrumentalists
 
1996 births
Canadian child singers
Canadian contemporary R&B singers
Canadian indie pop musicians
Canadian people of Calabrian descent
Canadian singer-songwriters
Canadian soul singers
Canadian women pop singers
Canadian women singer-songwriters
Def Jam Recordings artists
Grammy Award winners
Juno Award for Album of the Year winners
Juno Award for Breakthrough Artist of the Year winners
Juno Award for Pop Album of the Year winners
Living people
Musicians from Brampton
Musicians from Mississauga
Alternative R&B musicians